| frazioni            = Brancafora,  Carotte, Casotto, Ciechi, Longhi, Scalzeri
| mayor_party         = 
| mayor               = 
| area_footnotes      = 
| area_total_km2      = 12
| population_footnotes = 
| population_total    = 829
| population_as_of    = 
| pop_density_footnotes = 
| population_demonym  = 
| elevation_footnotes = 
| elevation_min_m     =
| elevation_max_m     =
| elevation_m         = 
| twin1               = 
| twin1_country       = 
| saint               = 
| day                 =  
| postal_code         = 36040
| area_code           = 0445
| website             = 
| footnotes           =

| istat               = 024076
| fractions           = Lastebasse, Lavarone (TN), Luserna (TN), Valdastico
| fiscal_code         = G406
}}

Pedemonte is a town in the province of Vicenza, Veneto, Italy. It is north of SP350.

Sources

(Google Maps)

Cities and towns in Veneto